İlhan Akgül (born 2 November 1970) is a retired Turkish football midfielder.

References

1970 births
Living people
Turkish footballers
Gaziosmanpaşaspor footballers
Aydınspor footballers
Karşıyaka S.K. footballers
Altay S.K. footballers
Turanspor footballers
Zonguldakspor footballers
Adanaspor footballers
Yıldırım Bosna S.K. footballers
Alibeyköyspor footballers
Association football midfielders
Süper Lig players